Mumbo Jumbo is the 17th studio album by English-Australian soft rock duo Air Supply, released in 2010. Two singles from the album, "Dance with Me" and "Faith in Love", became top-30 hits on the Billboard Adult Contemporary chart. The band's first studio record in seven years, it was the third album released on the Graham Russell label A Nice Pear/Odds On Records.

Reception 

AllMusic's Stephen Thomas Erlewine felt the band "employs some smoke and mirrors on this album, perhaps more than any of their previous albums, dabbling with a variety of textures and rhythms." At the end of his review on this album, he call it "their most adventurous records, and one of their best works."

Track listing
All songs written by Graham Russell, except where noted.

Personnel 
Air Supply
 Russell Hitchcock – vocals
 Graham Russell – vocals, acoustic guitar, keyboards (1, 3, 11, 12), string composer (3–5, 12), string conductor (12)

Additional musicians
 Frankie Moreno – acoustic piano (2–4, 6, 7, 9, 13, 14), string arrangements (3, 4, 5, 14), conductor (3–6, 14), string composer (3, 4, 5), Wurlitzer electric piano (4), backing vocals (9)
 Jed Moss – acoustic piano (8, 11, 12)
 Jeff Alleman – guitar (1, 6, 8, 10)
 Russell Letizia – guitar (2, 4, 7, 9, 13)
 Marty Lyman – guitar (6)
 Jonni Lightfoot – bass, guitar (3, 10, 11), keyboards (10)
 Mike Zerbe – drums 
 Lindsey Springer – cello (5, 14)
 Louis Clark: string arrangements (6)
 DeAnne Letourneau – concertmaster (3–6, 12, 14)
 Stina Nordenstam – backing vocals (1, 3, 10)
 Michael Johns – guest vocals (4)
 Sara Hudson – guest vocals (5)
 The Celtic Tenors – guest vocals (8)
 Deirdrie Gilsenen – featured vocals (8)

Production 
 Producer – Graham Russell
 Engineers – Jim "Bonzai" Caruso and Jonni Lightfoot
 Mixing – Jim "Bonzai" Caruso (Tracks 1, 7–10, 12–14); Sean O'Dwyer and Matt Salveson (Tracks 2–6 & 11).
 Mastered by Brian Gardner at Bernie Grundman Mastering (Hollywood, CA).
 CD Artwork – Lady Jodi Russell
 Cover Photography – Tyler Gourley
 Neon and Center Photos – Nyk Fry
 Management – Barry Siegel

References

2010 albums
Air Supply albums
Albums produced by Graham Russell